was a bureau within the Imperial Household Ministry under the Japanese Ritsuryō system. The Bureau of Palace Kitchens  was responsible for food preparation for religious ceremonies and feasts within the court. Beginning in the Heian Era, it was controlled by the Nakahara clan.

History
The origin of the current Imperial Household Agency can be traced back to the provisions on the government structure which were put into effect during the reign of Emperor Monmu, with significant modifications in 1702, 1870, and 1889,  Daijō-kan officials within this ministry structure were:  The management of food stores and food pood preparation within the court was encompassed within the organization structure of the ritsuryō system, including an acknowledgment of the place held by its senior officials within the structured palace hierarchy.

Officials
The  was the surveyor of all activities or works which were executed within the interior of the palace.  Under his indirect supervision, the senior members of the Ooiryō  hierarchy included:
 A. .
 B. .
 C. .
 D. .

Notes

References
 Sansom, George Bailey. (1952). Japan: A Short Cultural History. Stanford: Stanford University Press.   (cloth)  (paper) 
 Titsingh, Isaac. (1834). [Siyun-sai Rin-siyo/Hayashi Gahō, 1652], Nipon o daï itsi ran; ou,  Annales des empereurs du Japon.  Paris: Oriental Translation Fund of Great Britain and Ireland.
 Varley, H. Paul , ed. (1980). Kitabatake Chikafusa, 1359], Jinnō Shōtōki ("A Chronicle of Gods and Sovereigns: Jinnō Shōtōki of Kitabatake Chikafusa" translated by H. Paul Varley). New York: Columbia University Press.

See also
 Daijō-kan
 Imperial Household Department

701 establishments
Japanese monarchy
8th-century establishments in Japan